Grice hockey was a cross between standard field hockey and ice hockey played in the South of England in the latter half of the 20th century.  Teams were mainly based in South London and Brighton with one in Chichester.

History
The Streatham Exiles, playing on Sunday mornings at Tooting Bec Common, claimed to have originated the game of Grice Hockey  1957, arising out of many of the participants interested in Ice Hockey, and organising trips to Ice hockey matches.

The first match in a newly formed South London Grice Hockey League was played on 12 April 1959 where Streatham Exiles drew with Tooting Bec Lions in a one-all draw.

Following the closure of Sports Stadium Brighton ice rink  1965 the Grice Hockey became popular in Brighton on the south coast with the setting down of pitches in several local parks.

Game
The game was variant of Ice Hockey but played on grass, with a ball rather than a puck, and based of Ice Hockey rules.

References and further reading

Footnotes

Sources
 
 
 
 
 
 
 

Ball games
Variations of hockey
Team sports
Sports originating in England